Josh Lynn (born c. 1978) is an American football coach and former player. He is the head football coach at the University of Nebraska–Kearney, a position he has held since the 2017 season. Lynn served as the head football coach at his alma mater, Eastern New Mexico University, from 2012 to 2016.

Head coaching record

College

References

External links
 West Texas A&M profile

Year of birth missing (living people)
1970s births
Living people
American football tight ends
Delta State Statesmen football coaches
Eastern New Mexico Greyhounds football coaches
Eastern New Mexico Greyhounds football players
Nebraska–Kearney Lopers football coaches
Junior college football coaches in the United States